The Padre Hotel is a historical landmark hotel located on the corner of 18th and H streets in Bakersfield, California. Originally constructed in 1928 as a luxury hotel and restaurant, the eight-story building went through an extensive renovation and reopened in 2010. The Padre Hotel features 112 rooms and suites, several meeting spaces, a restaurant, a bar, a cafe, a bistro, and an outdoor bar with a cabana and firepits. Guests of the hotel are required to be at least 21 years of age, unless accompanied by an adult.

History 
Originally built in 1928, the eight-story Spanish Colonial Revival hotel had an auspicious and flamboyant beginning in the Central Valley's early and notorious oil rush days, but none quite so colorful as that of Milton “Spartacus” Miller, who purchased The Padre in 1954. For the next 45 years, he did spirited battle with Bakersfield's city fathers over a myriad of issues, even mounting a fake missile on the roof, defiantly directed at City Hall with no small disdain. Miller died in 1999.

A fire on the seventh floor in the 1950s resulted in many deaths, including children. Several children were tragically trapped and died in the basement during the 1952 earthquake. There have also been many suicides from the roof of the Padre Hotel.

The Padre Hotel fell into disrepair and was a derelict hotel from the 1960s until its most recent renovation in 2010. Prior to that renovation, the upper floors were condemned but often had squatters occupying the rooms. The bar downstairs stayed open during this time and was a meeting place for the city's misfits and barflies.

References

Earthquake safety 

 Earthquake readiness | How will Bakersfield stack up to 'the big one'
1952 Kern County earthquake - Wikipedia
Sixty-five years later, 1952 earthquake memories still vivid
1952 Kern County earthquake

Legends of haunting 

 Bakersfield's Historical Haunted Padre Hotel | Barry Allen | Sunny 105.3
 The Padre Hotel is haunted! Well, maybe
 Long Island Medium Theresa Caputo on the road, visits Bakersfield, Hotel Padre, Nashville
Haunted Padre Hotel & Frankenstein Castle | The Costa Rican Times
HPI: What We Do in the Shadows
Kern's Most Haunted: Are there ghosts in the Padre Hotel?

External links

Bakersfieldnow.com: KBAK Bakersfield News article — "New owners reveal plans for future of historic Padre Hotel" (2008)
Youtube.com: KBAK Bakersfield News segment — "Padre Hotel holds grand opening celebration"

Hotels in California
Buildings and structures in Bakersfield, California
Landmarks in Bakersfield, California
Hotels established in 1928
Hotel buildings completed in 1928
1928 establishments in California